Drunk Enough to Dance is the fourth studio album and second major label album by American rock band Bowling for Soup. It was recorded from 2001 to 2002 at Tree Sound Studios and Sonica Recording in Atlanta and Big Time Audio in Dallas.

Production and recording
After a UK, Canada and mid-west U.S. tour to promote their latest album "Let's Do It For Johnny" the band ventured out to film the new Britney Spears film Crossroads. After filming they would head to Atlanta in October 2001 to record their next new album. 
The album was produced by Butch Walker, formerly of Marvelous 3. 
In a newsletter from the band on January 9, 2002 Reddick said they "recorded 14 songs and that the album would contain a bonus track "Greatest Day"...and hopefully a song or two that Butch and I write next month...the import will have three more song that we did here in Dallas last month."

Release
It was released August 6, 2002 through Jive Records. The single, "Girl All the Bad Guys Want," was nominated for a Grammy Award in 2003 in the "Best Pop Performance By A Duo Or Group With Vocal" category. 
A re-release in 2003 added: "Punk Rock 101"; a cover of 1980s new wave band A Flock of Seagulls' "I Ran (So Far Away)"; and "Star Song". There is an acoustic version of the song "Belgium" at the very end of the album. 

"Punk Rock 101" was released as a radio single on May 20, 2003. Between late June and early August, the group appeared on the Warped Tour. The album is certified Silver in the U.K., having sold over 60,000 copies.

Reception

The album was included in Rock Sounds 101 Modern Classics list at number 63. The album was included at number 32 on Rock Sounds "The 51 Most Essential Pop Punk Albums of All Time" list. BuzzFeed included the album at number 28 on their "36 Pop Punk Albums You Need To Hear Before You F——ing Die" list. Cleveland.com ranked "Girl All the Bad Guys Want" at number 61 on their list of the top 100 pop-punk songs.

Track listing

Each version of the album has a number tracks that are five-to-six seconds of complete silence, titled "[Blank]," between the last song and "Belgium." The number of blank tracks varies upon the version, but "Belgium" is track 28 on all versions except for the Japanese Edition, where it is on track 20 after "Other Girls". There is about 1 minute of silence in between both songs.

Bonus tracks

B-sides

Personnel

Bowling for Soup:
 (Jaret Reddick) — vocals, rhythm guitars
 (Erik Chandler) — bass, vocals
 (Chris Burney) — lead guitars, vocals
  (Gary Wiseman) — drums

Production:
 Produced, Engineered and Mixed by Butch Walker for Ruby Red Productions, Atlanta, except:
 * Mixed by Tom Lord-Alge
 ** Additional Engineering by John Briglevich; Mixed by Tom Soares
 *** Produced by Jaret Reddick; Engineering by Steve Browne; Mixed by Tom Soares
 **** Produced by Rhys Fulber; Mixed by Tom Lord-Alge
 ***** Mixed by Chris Shaw
 Basic Tracks Recorded at Tree Studios, Atlanta, except "Punk Rock 101," "I Ran (So Far Away)" and "Star Song" Recorded at Ruby Red Studios, Atlanta, "Life After Lisa" Recorded at Sonica Recording, Atlanta and "Greatest Day" Recorded at Big Time Audio, Dallas.
 Overdubs Recorded at Ruby Red Studios, Atlanta, except "Life After Lisa" Recorded at Sonica Recording and "Greatest Day" Recorded at Big Time Audio
 Mixed at Stonehenge at ZAC Recording, Atlanta, except "Girl All the Bad Guys Want," "Punk Rock 101" and "I Ran (So Far Away)," Mixed at South Beach Studios, Miama, "Star Song" Mixed at Avatar Studios, NYC, "Life After Lisa" Mixed at Streetlight Studios, NYC and "Greatest Day" Mixed at Electric Lady Studios, New York
 Mastered by Chaz Harper at Battery Mastering, New York
 General Assistant to Butch Walker: Christie Priode
 Assistant Engineers:
 Tree Sound - Rus-T Cobb and Robert Hannon
 Stonehenge at ZAC Recording: Rus-T Cobb and Jon Oullette
 Second Engineer: Ari Newman
 Sonica Recording: Mike Schneider
 Streetlight Studios: Tim Obremski
 Electric Lady: Shinobu Mitsuoka
 Ruby Red Studios: Rus-T Cobb
 Avatar Studios: Ross Petersen
 Percussion, piano, Hammond and additional guitars by Butch Walker Additional vocal on "Life After Lisa" by Butch Walker
 Additional Backing Vocals on "I Don't Wanna Rock" and "Running from Your Dad" by FFroe and Howie
 Keyboards on "I Ran (So Far Away)" by Jamie Muhoberac
 Management: Jeff Roe for FFroe
 Legal Representation: Mike McKoy - Serling, Rooks, Ferrara
 Road Crew: Sweet Charlie, Greg Lobdell

Charts
Album

Singles

Notes
 A  Featured in frontman Jaret Reddick's seventh Bowling for Soup podcast, released March 10, 2010.

References
 Citations

Sources

External links

 Drunk Enough to Dance at YouTube (streamed copy where licensed)

2002 albums
Bowling for Soup albums
Albums produced by Butch Walker
Jive Records albums